Kristin Armstrong Savola (born August 11, 1973) is a former professional road bicycle racer and three-time Olympic gold medalist, the winner of the women's individual time trial in 2008, 2012, and 2016. She announced a return to competitive cycling beginning in the 2011 season, competing for Peanut Butter & Co. TWENTY12 at the Redlands Classic.

Background
Prior to her professional cycling career, Armstrong had been a junior Olympian in swimming, a distance runner in college, and then a triathlete. She spent many hours perfecting her strokes in the pool at the Boise Family YMCA, where she also served as Director of Aquatics, managing more than 50 lifeguards, swim instructors, and others.  She was diagnosed with osteoarthritis in both hips in 2001 at age 27, and told that she could no longer run at an elite level, thus ending her triathlon career and leading her to focus exclusively on cycling.

The three-time national champion finished 8th (top U.S. finisher) in the women's road race at the 2004 Summer Olympics in Athens.

At the 2008 Summer Olympics in China, Armstrong completed the biggest achievement of her career by winning the gold medal in the women's road time trial competition on August 13.  Finishing in under 35 minutes, Armstrong was 25 seconds ahead of silver medalist Emma Pooley from Great Britain, with Karin Thürig from Switzerland taking the bronze.

Of Armstrong, Velonews wrote: "Kristin Armstrong is famous for both her success in bicycle racing, and the 'type-A' attention to detail that keeps her climbing the podium at critical races every season."

Armstrong announced at the end of 2010 that she would return to competitive cycling, with the goal of competing at the London 2012 Summer Olympics. In a written statement, she stated that her retirement was merely temporary in order to start a family:

I love cycling and I love competing.  I stopped racing after the 2009 World Championships not because I was burned out, but because my husband and I wanted to start a family...I told myself from the beginning if everything went smoothly with the birth of our son, Lucas William, I would consider racing again.

In 2011, Armstrong returned to compete with the Peanut Butter & Co. Team TWENTY12, of which she was a part owner. She won three of the four stages (criterium, road race, and time trial) and the overall title during the Sea Otter Classic in April.  However, during the first stage of the Tour of the Gila, which she had won twice previously, Armstrong came down with food poisoning. She ended up withdrawing from the race and returning home to recover.

Armstrong successfully defended her Olympic title in the individual time trial at the 2012 Olympics in London and became the oldest rider to win an Olympic time trial, and finished 35th in the Women's road race.  She announced her retirement after the 2012 Olympics.

In September 2012, Armstrong's Olympic gold medal-winning time trial bike was stolen while in transit between Germany and the USA.

In April 2015, Armstrong announced that she would be coming out of retirement to race at the 2015 Pan American Road Championships in Leon, Mexico, having been selected by USA Cycling for the individual time trial. Two days after announcing Armstrong's selection, however, the USA Cycling Selection Committee reconvened, deciding that the new selection process under which Armstrong had been chosen had not been published in a timely manner, and that as a result the federation's older Principles of Athlete Selection, which had been issued in 2008, should be used instead for selection to the Pan American Championships. The upshot was that Armstrong's place was taken by Tayler Wiles. The following month, Armstrong won the United States National Time Trial Championships in Chattanooga, Tennessee, beating Carmen Small by 13 seconds.

In August 2016, Armstrong made history at the 2016 Summer Olympics in Rio de Janeiro after coming out of retirement to win the gold medal in the women's individual time trial and becoming the first rider ever to win three gold medals in the same discipline. She also became the oldest female cyclist to win an Olympic medal.

In September 2017 Armstrong joined USA Cycling as Endurance Performance Director.

In December 2019 Armstrong created and launched her bike computer mount line of products called KX3 Sports.

Personal life

Armstrong's father was an officer in the US Marines. Born in Memphis, Tennessee, she lived in Tennessee and California and attended high school in Havelock, North Carolina, and abroad in Okinawa, Japan, where she graduated from Kubasaki High School in 1991. She enrolled at the University of Idaho in Moscow, where she ran track for the Vandals for a season as a walk-on and was a member of the Kappa Kappa Gamma sorority. Armstrong earned a bachelor's degree from UI in sports physiology in 1995, and currently lives in Boise, Idaho.

She is often confused with the ex-wife of fellow cyclist Lance Armstrong, whose name is also Kristin. Kristin Armstrong the cyclist and Lance Armstrong are not related.

Armstrong is married to Joe Savola; their son Lucas William Savola was born on September 15, 2010. Four months before his birth, she gave the commencement address at her alma mater in May 2010.

Major results

2003
 2nd Road race, National Road Championships
 3rd  Time trial, Pan American Games
 5th Australia World Cup
 10th Overall Sea Otter Classic
2004
 1st  Road race, National Road Championships
 2nd Overall Sea Otter Classic
1st Prologue
 4th Overall Tour de l'Aude Cycliste Féminin
 5th Overall Redlands Bicycle Classic
1st Stage 3
 8th Road race, Summer Olympics
2005
 1st  Time trial, Pan American Road Championships
 1st  Time trial, National Road Championships
 1st Overall Sea Otter Classic
1st Prologue & Stage 2
 1st Overall Valley of the Sun Stage Race
1st Stage 1
 1st Stage 1 International Tour de Toona
 2nd  Individual pursuit, Pan American Track Championships
 2nd Overall San Dimas Stage Race
1st Stage 1
 2nd Overall Tour Cycliste Féminin International de l'Ardèche
 3rd  Time trial, UCI Road World Championships
 3rd Individual pursuit, National Track Championships
 3rd Overall Tour de l'Aude Cycliste Féminin
 5th Overall Redlands Bicycle Classic
2006
 1st  Time trial, UCI Road World Championships
 National Road Championships
1st  Road race
1st  Time trial
 1st Overall North Star Grand Prix
1st Stages 1 (ITT) & 4
 1st Overall International Tour de Toona
1st Stage 3
 1st Overall Tour of the Gila
1st Stages 2 & 5
 1st Overall Euregio Ladies Tour
1st Stage 1
 Cascade Cycling Classic
1st Stages 2 & 3 (ITT)
 3rd  Individual pursuit, 2005–06 UCI Track Cycling World Cup Classics, Sydney
 3rd Coupe du Monde Cycliste Féminine de Montréal
 6th Overall Redlands Bicycle Classic
 6th Overall Tour du Grand Montréal
 7th Overall Holland Ladies Tour
2007
 National Road Championships
1st  Time trial
2nd Road race
 1st Overall North Star Grand Prix
1st Stages 3 (ITT), 5 & 6
 1st  Overall Holland Ladies Tour
1st  Mountains classification
1st Stage 7 (ITT)
 1st Overall International Tour de Toona
1st Stage 6
 1st Souvenir Magali Pache
 2nd  Time trial, UCI Road World Championships
 5th La Flèche Wallonne Féminine
2008
 1st  Time trial, Summer Olympics
 1st Overall Women's Tour of New Zealand
1st Stages 3 & 5 (ITT)
 1st Overall North Star Grand Prix
1st Stages 1, 3 (ITT), 5 & 6
 1st Overall Cascade Cycling Classic
1st Stages 1, 3 (ITT) & 5
 1st Novilon Eurocup Ronde van Drenthe
 1st Boise Twilight Criterium
 2nd Tour of Flanders for Women
 3rd  Team pursuit, 2007–08 UCI Track Cycling World Cup Classics, Los Angeles
 5th Time trial, UCI Road World Championships
 5th Coupe du Monde Cycliste Féminine de Montréal
 10th Ronde van Drenthe
2009
 UCI Road World Championships
1st  Time trial
4th Road race
 1st Overall Tour of the Gila
1st Stages 1, 3 (ITT) & 5
 1st Overall North Star Grand Prix
1st Stages 1 (ITT) & 6
 1st Overall Tour Cycliste Féminin International de l'Ardèche
1st Stage 3
 1st Tour de Berne
 1st Open de Suède Vårgårda TTT
 3rd Trofeo Alfredo Binda-Comune di Cittiglio
 4th Overall Tour de l'Aude Cycliste Féminin
1st Stage 5
2011
 1st Overall Sea Otter Classic
1st Stages 1, 2 & 3 (ITT)
 1st Tour of California Women's Time Trial
 2nd Chrono des Nations
 3rd Time trial, National Road Championships
 3rd Overall North Star Grand Prix
1st Stage 1 (ITT)
 4th Overall San Dimas Stage Race
 6th Overall Cascade Cycling Classic
 7th Overall Redlands Bicycle Classic
2012
 1st  Time trial, Summer Olympics
 1st Overall San Dimas Stage Race
1st Stages 1 & 2 (ITT)
 1st Overall Tour of the Gila
1st Stages 1, 2, 3 (ITT) & 5
 1st Tour of California Women's Time Trial
 1st Stage 1 (ITT) Energiewacht Tour
 Cascade Cycling Classic
1st Prologue, Stages 1 & 2 (ITT)
 2nd Tour of Flanders for Women
 8th Overall Women's Tour of New Zealand
1st Stage 1 (ITT)
2015
 1st  Time trial, National Road Championships
 1st Overall Women's USA Pro Challenge
1st Stage 1 (ITT)
 1st Stage 3 (ITT) Redlands Bicycle Classic
 2nd Overall Cascade Cycling Classic
1st Stages 1 & 2 (ITT)
 3rd Tour of California Women's Time Trial
 5th Time trial, UCI Road World Championships
2016
 1st  Time trial, Summer Olympics
 1st Overall San Dimas Stage Race
1st Stage 1 (ITT)
 1st Overall Redlands Bicycle Classic
1st Stage 3
 2nd Overall Tour of the Gila
1st Stage 3 (ITT)
 2nd Overall Tour of California
1st Stage 2 (TTT)
 2nd Overall Cascade Cycling Classic
 3rd Time trial, National Road Championships

References

External links 

 
 
 Cycling News.com – The other Armstrong: more than a water-carrier – October 29, 2003
 Cascade Cycling Classic – 2008

1973 births
Living people
American female cyclists
Olympic gold medalists for the United States in cycling
UCI Road World Champions (women)
Olympic medalists in cycling
Cyclists at the 2003 Pan American Games
Cyclists at the 2004 Summer Olympics
Cyclists at the 2008 Summer Olympics
Cyclists at the 2012 Summer Olympics
Cyclists at the 2016 Summer Olympics
American cycling road race champions
University of Idaho alumni
Sportspeople from Memphis, Tennessee
Sportspeople from Boise, Idaho
Medalists at the 2008 Summer Olympics
Medalists at the 2012 Summer Olympics
Medalists at the 2016 Summer Olympics
Pan American Games medalists in cycling
Pan American Games bronze medalists for the United States
People from Havelock, North Carolina
Medalists at the 2003 Pan American Games
21st-century American women
Cyclists from North Carolina